Caenopedina superba is a species of sea urchins of the family Pedinidae. Their armour is covered with spines. Caenopedina superba was first scientifically described in 1925 by Hubert Lyman Clark.

References

Animals described in 1925
Pedinoida